Candidoni is a comune (municipality) in the Metropolitan City of Reggio Calabria in the Italian region Calabria, located about  southwest of Catanzaro and about  northeast of Reggio Calabria.

Geography
Candidoni borders the following municipalities: Laureana di Borrello, Limbadi, Mileto, Nicotera, Rosarno, San Calogero, Serrata.

Demographics

References

External links

Cities and towns in Calabria